The Potosi Formation is a geologic formation in Missouri, Illinois and Indiana. It preserves fossils dating back to the Cambrian period.

Paleofauna

Monoplacophora
 Gayneoconus
 G. echolsi

See also

 List of fossiliferous stratigraphic units in Missouri
 Paleontology in Missouri

References

 

Cambrian Missouri
Dolomite formations
Geography of St. Francois County, Missouri
Cambrian System of North America
Geologic formations of Missouri
Cambrian southern paleotropical deposits